High Card (stylized in all caps) is a Japanese multimedia franchise created by Homura Kawamoto, Hikaru Muno, and TMS Entertainment. It consists of a manga series, a novel series, drama CDs, and an anime television series by Studio Hibari, which premiered in January 2023. The project's theme is poker, with everything from the title to the names of fictional locations referencing some form of playing card game. 

During a preview of the anime series at Anime NYC in November 2022, Kawamoto and Muno further explained that High Card was heavily inspired by the Kingsman movies, including their decision to put the setting in a fictional kingdom outside of Japan, hoping to appeal to a wider audience across the world.

Plot
The royal family of the Kingdom of Fourland holds a secret deck of 52 "X-Playing cards," each of which bestow a superhuman power or ability to whoever uses them. However, the cards were nearly stolen one month ago, and then scattered across the land. In the present, a thief named Finn is struggling to raise funds for his orphanage before the landlord clears it out. After hitching a ride to a casino, Finn soon finds himself inducted into High Card, a special group tasked by the King to recover all 52 cards, while working undercover as salesmen for the Pinochle car company. However, High Card must deal with threats from rival car company "Who's Who" seeking to crush Pinochle, and the Klondike mafia family who wants the X-Playing cards for their own nefarious ends.

Characters

The newest member of High Card, a skilled pickpocket with great eyesight and focus allowing him to think multiple steps ahead. After trying to quickly raise money to save the orphanage where he grew up, Finn soon found himself embroiled in the battle over the X-Playing cards. He holds the 2 of Spades, with the ability "Neo New Nambu," which summons a loaded Nambu revolver into his hand, and can summon extra bullets into his free hand.  

A flirty womanizer and skilled driver with a sweet tooth. He recruits Finn after seeing his skills first-hand in Bell End, and becomes his mentor at Pinochle's Old Maid branch. He wields the 5 of Hearts, with the "Calorie's High" ability, allowing him to convert excess calories to heal injuries instantly that would otherwise prove fatal.

The 14-year-old son of the Pinochle company's CEO, and the manager of the Old Maid office, with an abrasive demeanor that often grates on his colleagues. However, his position in society and his money puts him at the top of High Card. Leo wields the 7 of Diamonds, with the "Never No Dollars" ability that allows him to instantly swap any amount of money physically nearby for an object of equivalent value. 

The daughter of a master swordsman from the Far East, Wendy handles the accounting for Pinochle's Old Maid office. She wields the Ace of Spades that summons "Love and Peace," a large sword with a mind of its own.

A highly intelligent PhD student at the University of Cribbage and a good cook who manages the systems at Pinochle's Old Maid office, but his aloof personality makes him difficult to approach for most people. He wields the 3 of Clubs, with the power "Green Green," allowing him to communicate with nearby plants and control them.

Leo's butler who serves as an administrator for High Card who does everything from serving tea to servicing cars at Pinochle's Old Maid branch. 

The CEO of Pinochle, Leo's father, and the head of High Card who works directly under the King.

Theodore's personal secretary who carries out his orders faithfully.

The flamboyant and charismatic CEO of "Who's Who" in a one-sided rivalry with his childhood friend Theodore, though he does not reciprocate. 

Norman's personal secretary and bodyguard. In contrast to his boss, Blist prefers to keep a strictly professional attitude while on the job, constantly reminding Norman about pay and labor regulations even as he works to collect X-Playing cards for him. He is also a Player with the 10 of Clubs power, "Million Volt," which lets him channel electricity through his body.

Norman's other personal secretary and bodyguard who sees his obsession with his rival and the X-Playing cards as a waste of time, even as she provides support for him.

The head of the Klondike family, known throughout Fourland as ruthless mafia boss, though he appears to have a softer side when dealing with women and children. Ban seeks the X-Playing cards for his own ends and has a shared history with Theodore and Norman. 

A young Klondike executive who serves as a mediating force for inter-family struggles, and manages the search for the X-Playing cards.

A member of the Klondike family who works under Tilt to acquire the X-Playing cards, and is cruel to nearly everyone he meets. He wields the 3 of Diamonds with the "Marble Rumble" power that lets him turn anything he grabs into marbles, which he can then use as projectile weapons.

A veteran Inspector within the Shield Police Department, and one of the few people outside High Card who is aware of its existence as well as the X-Playing cards. Greg is an old friend of both Ban and Theodore.

A novice detective who works under Greg. 

A social media influencer looking to find her "soulmate." A Player who holds the 2 of Diamonds, "Love Connection," which sticks two people's hands together. After an encounter with Finn and Chris, she later becomes a waitress at their local bar.

Chris' younger sister. She has a genetic disease inherited from her mother. 

The Director of the Sun Fields Orphanage, a good-natured man struggling to keep the orphanage open while having trouble paying rent to an uncaring landlord.

A card shark blessed with incredible luck thanks to the 10 of Diamonds ability, "Unlucky Poky," which granted him preternatural luck and thus prevented him from being harmed. After being threatened into giving up his card, he is soon killed after losing his luck along with the card.

A former member of High Card 25 years ago who was part of a team previously led by Leo and Chris' fathers, Theodore and Tyler. However due to a decision made by Theodore regarding a young Chris, she dishearteningly left the team and exiled herself. Years later, she saves Finn and entrusts him with her Card, the J of Spades, "Coming Home" that allows her to pull any in-sight object towards her.

Media

Anime
On June 9, 2021, it was announced that Homura Kawamoto, Hikaru Muno, and TMS Entertainment were working on a multimedia franchise, which include an anime television series. The project is done in collaboration with KADOKAWA Co., Ltd. and Sammy Co., Ltd.

The series is produced by Studio Hibari and directed by Junichi Wada, with Kenichi Yamashita, Kazuhiko Inukai, Shingo Nagai, and Naoki Kuroyanagi writing the scripts; Nozomi Kawano designing the characters; and Ryo Takahashi composing the music. It premiered on January 9, 2023, on AT-X and other networks. 

The opening theme song is "Trickster" by Five New Old, while the ending theme song is "Squad!" by Meychan. Crunchyroll licensed the series and is set to premiere at the same time as Japan on January 9, 2023.

Print
A manga and novel adaptation of the franchise have been announced. The side story manga, titled High Card -♢9 No Mercy, began serialization in Square Enix's online manga magazine Manga UP! on August 31, 2022.

Drama CD
A drama CD adaptation of the franchise was released on December 3, 2021.

Notes

References

External links
  
 

2023 anime television series debuts
AT-X (TV network) original programming
Bandai Namco franchises
Card games in anime and manga
Crunchyroll anime
Gangan Comics manga
Japanese webcomics
Kadokawa Dwango franchises
Mass media franchises
Shōnen manga
Studio Hibari
TMS Entertainment